The Hustler was a Mini-based project designed in 1978 by Aston Martin Lagonda designer William Towns and later developed into a kit car by his Interstyl design studio.  

The original version used upper and lower square-section steel frames, clad with glass fibre panels and large flat glass windows. On most models sliding side windows acted as doors. It used the front and rear sub frames and mechanical components from the British Leyland Mini, Metro or BMC1100/1300. The Hustler came in four and six wheel versions: the six wheel version used two Mini rear sub frame assemblies. The style was very much off-road/utility in the rectilinear idiom of the Lagonda and Bulldog.

At the 1981 Earl's Court Motor Show, a wooden version was introduced, using marine plywood and solid wood as both structure and body. Shortly afterwards, a sportier version was also introduced, using the same lower steel structure but with an upper structure with less height. An open-topped version, the Sport, was introduced at about the same time. The vehicle kits were sold directly from William Towns' home at Stretton-on-Fosse, near Moreton-in-Marsh, Gloucestershire, where his design studio was based. 

About 500 were made.

Models 
Hustler 4  BL Mini-based original model.
Hustler 6  Used two Mini rear subframes to give four rear wheels.
Hustler Huntsman  Larger and more powerful BL 1100/1300 or Metro based model. 4 or 6 wheel versions.
Hustler Hellcat  Stripped down Mini-based jeep version. Usually 4-wheeled but 6-wheel version available.
Hustler Sport  Two-seat Mini-based drophead.
Hustler Sprint  Two-seat Mini-based coupe.
The Hustler in Wood  Designed to be built from plans in marine ply with a supplied alloy-framed glasshouse.
Hustler Holiday  One-box MPV version. 4- or 6-wheel versions.
Hustler Force  Conventional, full-depth doors instead of sliding glass. 4- or 6-wheel versions.
Hustler Highlander  One-off imposing 6-wheeled Jaguar V12-powered luxury version. 
Hustler Harrier  High-roof version designed to take a wheelchair in the back.
Hustler Rag Top  Canvas roof version. 4 wheeled Mini sub frame. Similar to Hellcat. Only one ever produced. Now in France.

References 
Kitcars International Guide to Kit Cars and their Values: 1964–1991 by Hadyn Davies and Ian Hyne (1991)

External links
The Hustler: not so much a car, more a way of life...
Review of a wooden clad Hustler 4

Kit car manufacturers
Cars of England
Six-wheeled vehicles